These were the eleven squads (all Test nations and two ODI nations) picked to take part in the 2000 ICC KnockOut Trophy, the second installment of the Champions Trophy cricket tournament. The tournament was held in Kenya from 3 to 15 October 2000. In the preliminary quarter finals, two ODI full-status teams Kenya and Zimbabwe played with India and Sri Lanka respectively, and India and Sri Lanka won their matches convincingly. In third preliminary quarter final, England beat Bangladesh to secure his position in Knockout Tournament. New Zealand won the second edition of the ICC KnockOut Trophy by defeating India in the final by four wickets, which was their first ICC event to be won.

Squads

Australia
Shane Warne and Collin Miller was originally selected in the squad, but later withdrew for injuries and Mark Higgs and Brad Young was replaced respectively.

Bangladesh

England

India

Kenya

New Zealand

Pakistan

South Africa

Sri Lanka

West Indies

Zimbabwe

References

External links

ICC Champions Trophy squads
2000 ICC KnockOut Trophy